Charles Adkins may refer to:

Charles Adkins (politician) (1863–1941), U.S. Representative from Illinois
Charles Adkins (boxer) (1932–1993), American Olympic boxer

See also
Charles "Speedy" Atkins (1875–1928), American folk figure
Adkins (surname)